Scrapper is a 2023 British film written and directed by Charlotte Regan in her debut feature-length picture. It is made by BBC Film with Great Point Media, and stars Harris Dickinson, Lola Campbell and Alin Uzun. The film premiered at the 2023 Sundance Film Festival where it won the Grand Jury Prize for the World Cinema Dramatic Competition.

Synopsis
Jason (Dickinson) returns from his life in Ibiza to live with his 12 year-old daughter (Campbell), whom he has never previously met, after her mother Olivia (Brady) dies.

Cast
Harris Dickinson as Jason
Lola Campbell as Georgie
Alin Uzun as Ali
Cary Crankson
Carys Bowkett
Freya Bell as Layla
Laura Aikman as Kaye
Ayokunle Oyesanwo
Ayobami Oyesanwo
Ayooluwa Oyesanwo
Olivia Brady as Vicky

Production
Principal photography took place in East London in the summer of 2021. Dickinson had previously worked with writer/director Regan and producer Barrowclough before on the 2019 short film Oats & Barley.
Dickinson told Deadline that he "really wanted to work with those guys again. I read the script and liked the story and saw Lola's tape and thought it would be an in interesting thing to do." Funding came from DMC Film, BFI, BBC Films, Great Point Media, and Creative England. In May 2022 France-based company Charades picked up worldwide distributing rights. In February 2023 Charades revealed the rights had been sold to Picture House (UK), and Madman (Australia), amongst others.

Release
The film premiered at the 2023 Sundance Film Festival where it won the Grand Jury Prize for the World Cinema Dramatic Competition.

Reception
Review aggregator Rotten Tomatoes reports that 92% of 24 critics have given the film a positive review, with an average rating of 7.0 out of 10. Metacritic gives the film a weighted average rating of 66 out of 100, based on 9 reviews, indicating "generally favorable reviews". 

Leslie Felperin in The Hollywood Reporter praised the performance of the leads
saying Dickinson "brings soulfulness to his rapscallion hitherto-absentee dad Jason, and total newcomer Lola Campbell, who brings natural comic timing to her turn as 12-year-old protagonist Georgie". Damon Wise in Deadline Hollywood also mentioned the two leads saying "Scrapper is essentially a two-hander, since the fat-free plot is essentially the two getting to know each other and finding out whether they might even like each other… Campbell [is] something of a find, in a spiky role that brings a refreshing, unsentimental edge to this after-Aftersun story". Adding "It's also good to see a kitchen-sink drama that doesn't take itself overly seriously, but the downside of that is that Scrapper sometimes seems a little flippant, given that, smart as she is, our plucky heroine is still a vulnerable child, all alone in the world. Still, it's early days in Regan's career, and it will be interesting to see what other kinds of stories and genres she has in her offbeat sights".

Variety writer Guy Lodge highlighted the pastel coloured palette of the film which "offers a sunnier take on familiar kitchen-sink territory, but is occasionally a touch too cute".  He described the work of director of photography Molly Manning Walker as "vibrant, stock-shifting lensing" which "deftly negotiates the film's toggling impulses between social and magic realism". Production designer Elena Muntoni is said to strike "a clever balance between mundanely escapist decorative flourishes — like the cotton-candy clouds painted on a bedroom wall — and Georgie's actual flights of fantasy, like the scrap-metal tower she builds to the sky in a locked spare room. Reality eventually makes cruel but necessary intrusions in her life, and in Regan's film too: Both are stronger for the disruption."

References

External links

2023 films
2023 drama films
Films about father–daughter relationships
2023 directorial debut films
BBC Film films
British drama films 
2023 independent films
2020s British films
2020s English-language films
Films shot in London
Films set in London